The 1951 Southern Conference baseball tournament was held in Greensboro, North Carolina, from May 20 and 21.  The South Division's second seed  won the tournament, the first of three tournament titles prior to the Atlantic Coast Conference creation for the 1954 season.

The tournament used a single-elimination format.

Bracket

References

Southern Conference Baseball Tournament
1951 Southern Conference baseball season